The Minutemen was a militant anti-communist, nativist organization formed in the United States in the early 1960s. The founder and head of the group was Robert DePugh, a biochemist from Norborne, Missouri. The Minutemen worked against the rise of communism. The group conducted themselves as others of the era, by preparing, organizing and supporting their community. The Minutemen organized themselves into small cells and stockpiled weapons for an anticipated counter-revolution.

DePugh published a 10-page pamphlet on guerilla warfare via the Minutemen in 1961. The Minutemen's newsletter was called On Target.  He was a founder of the Patriotic Party in 1966.

In 1966, DePugh was arrested on federal weapons charges, which were later dismissed. Their offices were bombed in 1967, and DePugh resigned from the Minutemen in 1967. In February 1968, he was indicted by a federal grand jury in Seattle, Washington for conspiracy to commit bank robbery. Also in 1968, he was arrested for violation of federal firearms laws. He skipped bail and went underground for over a year until he was caught in 1969 in Truth or Consequences, New Mexico. He was convicted in 1970 and released from prison in May 1973. DePugh later wrote an anti-communist quasi-survivalist manual, Can You Survive?, and was associated briefly with Liberty Lobby.

Publications
The Minutemen's publication was a newsletter called "On Target".

Principles of Guerrilla Warfare, Robert DePugh. Published by the Minutemen, San Diego, CA, 1961. 10 pages.
Blueprint for Victory, Robert DePugh. 1966.
Can You Survive? Robert DePugh. Published by Desert Publications, El Dorado, AZ, 1973. 214 pages.

See also
 Secret Army Organization

References

Further reading
J. Harry Jones, Jr. The Minutemen. Doubleday & Company, Inc.: Garden City, NY, 1968. 426 pages. Expanded paperback edition published as A Private Army 1969.
Interview with former Minuteman Robert N. Taylor
Eric Beckemeier. Traitors Beware: A History of Robert DePugh's Minutemen, Eric Beckemeier Publications, Hardin, MO, 2008.

External links
FBI files on the Minutemen and DePugh, obtained under the FOIA and hosted at the Internet Archive

Headquarters file Part 1
Headquarters file Part 2
Headquarters file Part 3
NYC office file 1
NYC office file 2
NYC office file 3
NYC office file 4
NYC office file 5
NYC office file 6
NYC office file 7
NYC office file 8
NYC office file 9
NYC office file 10
NYC office file 11
NYC office file 12

Anti-communist organizations in the United States
Right-wing militia organizations in the United States